Gilson Langaro Dipp (1 October 1944 – 28 November 2022) was a Brazilian jurist and magistrate. He served as Minister of the Superior Court of Justice from 1998 to 2014.

Dipp died in Brasília on 28 November 2022, at the age of 78.

References

1944 births
2022 deaths
Brazilian jurists
Federal University of Rio Grande do Sul alumni
People from Passo Fundo